is a Japanese idol group produced by Yasushi Akimoto. The group was established as a subgroup of Keyakizaka46 named Hiragana Keyakizaka46 on November 30, 2015,  and was renamed and spun off into its own group on February 11, 2019. The group's name is adopted from the alternate reading of Hyūgazaka Street in Mita, Minato-ku, Tokyo, following the custom of naming groups after sloping streets in the Sakamichi Series.

As a subgroup of Keyakizaka46, Hiragana Keyakizaka46's works were released as part of the main group's releases, except for the album Hashiridasu Shunkan (2018). As of June 2022, Hinatazaka46 has released seven singles and one album, and their first single, "Kyun", is the best-selling debut single by a female artist in Japan. Members of the group have also appeared in television dramas such as Re:Mind (2017), Dasada (2020), and Koeharu! (2021), the weekly variety show Hinatazaka de Aimashō, as well as two theatrically-released documentaries.

History

2015–2018: Hiragana Keyakizaka46 

Colloquially, Hiragana Keyakizaka46 was also known as Hiragana Keyaki, while the main Keyakizaka46 group was known as Kanji Keyaki.

At its founding, Hiragana Keyakizaka46 consisted of only one member, Neru Nagahama, who did not participate in the Keyakizaka46 final audition due to her parents' earlier disapproval and was assigned to the subgroup as a "special case"; she would later be appointed a  member of both groups and join the main Keyakizaka46 lineup starting from their second single, "Sekai ni wa Ai Shika Nai" (2016). Auditions were held soon after for Hiragana Keyakizaka46, and the first generation of eleven members joined the group in May 2016. The group was initially announced as the "under" group to Keyakizaka46 with the possibility of its members also being selected for the main group's song lineup, a system already practiced by Nogizaka46. Due to the two groups' increasing activities, Nagahama left Hiragana Keyakizaka46 in September 2017, becoming only a member of the main group. A second generation of nine people was added in August 2017, and a third, again consisting of only Hinano Kamimura, was added in November 2018 through a Sakamichi Series joint audition.

As a subgroup, Hiragana Keyakizaka46 released their music as part of the main group's singles and albums. Their first release as a group is the B-side "Hiragana Keyaki" from "Sekai ni wa Ai Shika Nai", although Nagahama did perform  from Keyakizaka46's debut single "Silent Majority" (2016) with several Keyakizaka46 members. In concerts, the two groups often performed together, but Hiragana Keyakizaka46 also held independent concerts, including a nationwide Zepp tour in 2017 and a three-day Nippon Budokan performance in January 2018, after Keyakizaka46 pulled out due to lead singer Yurina Hirate's injury. Hiragana Keyakizaka46 also released an independent album in 2018 titled Hashiridasu Shunkan.

In terms of variety shows, Hiragana Keyakizaka46 initially appeared in Keyakizaka46's shows Keyakitte, Kakenai? and KeyaBingo!, and started their own show Hiragana Oshi in 2018. The first generation also appeared in the drama series Re:Mind in 2017.

The play was released on Hulu Japan in February 2021.

2019–present: Reborn as Hinatazaka46 

Hiragana Keyakizaka46 became an independent group on February 11, 2019, and was renamed Hinatazaka46. The new name is an alternate reading of  street in Minato-ku, Tokyo, following the custom of Sakamichi Series of having its groups named after sloping streets. The group's official Twitter and TikTok accounts were launched shortly, and their variety TV program was renamed to Hinatazaka de Aimashō. They also announced in a Showroom live broadcast that their fandom name would be Ohisama (おひさま), which is a slang for the Sun as "just like a  cannot exist without the Sun, [Hinatazaka46] cannot exist without the fans".

Their first single, "Kyun", was released on March 27, 2019, and surpassed 476,000 copies sold within the first week. The single became the best-selling debut single by a female artist in Japan, a record previously held by Keyakizaka46's "Silent Majority". "Kyun" also won the Best Choreography award at the 2019 MTV Video Music Awards. On September 24, a rhythm game titled Uni's On Air was released that featured Keyakizaka46 and Hinatazaka46. Hinatazaka46 attended the 70th NHK Kōhaku Uta Gassen for the first time in the group's history, where they performed "Kyun". After that, "Azato Kawaii" was shown at the 71st NHK Kōhaku Uta Gassen, and "Kimi Shika Katan" was performed at the 72nd NHK Kōhaku Uta Gassen.

On January 16, 2020, the members of Hinatazaka46 were featured in a television series titled Dasada, with Nao Kosaka as the main protagonist. On February 16, 2020, three members were added to the third generation from the remaining unassigned members of the 2018 Sakamichi Series joint audition, bringing that generation up to four people. On July 31, 2020, Hinatazaka46 live streamed a concert titled Hinatazaka46 Live Online, Yes! With You!, where they announced that their first studio album will be released on September 23. Their mascot character, a sky blue bird named Poka, was introduced at the live streamed Hinakuri (Hina Christmas) 2020 concert on December 24.

On March 7, 2022, the group announced the audition for their fourth generation members with applications starting that day and screening taking place on April 4. Twelve members passed the audition out of 51,038 participants, and they were gradually introduced to the public from September 22 to October 3. They would make their musical debut with the song "Blueberry & Raspberry", included on the group's 8th single, "Tsuki to Hoshi ga Odoru Midnight". It was first shown at the Happy Smile Tour 2022 in Tokyo held on November 12–13, 2022.

On March 30–31, 2022, the group held their long-sought first Tokyo Dome concert, attended by about 100,000 people in two days. The concert was originally scheduled for 2020, but postponed twice due to the COVID-19 pandemic.

Members 
Since its founding, Hinatazaka46 has had a total of 37 members from four generations. 32 of those members are still in the group.

If third generation members are marked with an asterisk (*), it means that they joined after the initial third generation members on February 15, 2020.

Past members

Notable subgroups 
These are the subgroups of Hinatazaka46 that have appeared in events independent of the group.

Hana-chans 
Members: Suzuka Tomita, Konoka Matsuda

 is an acoustic guitar duo unit, named after the  kanji in both members' names. Their first song as a duo, was released as part of Hinatazaka46's third single.

On June 27, 2021, Hana-chans held their first independent live show on MTV Japan, titled MTV Acoustic Flowers - Until Full Bloom "Bell & Like"-, in which they covered Hinatazaka46 songs and Taylor Swift's "We Are Never Ever Getting Back Together".

On October 5, the duo served as the opening act for MTV Live Match 2021, and also performed as part of Hinatazaka46 for the main event.

Saitama Trio/Color Chart 
Members: Miku Kanemura, Akari Nibu, Miho Watanabe (before graduation)

In September 2018, they served as one-day traffic chiefs of the Saitama Prefectural Police to promote traffic safety.

In October 2020, the trio started the radio program  on Tokyo FM; the supermarket chain Belc, which sponsors the program, subsequently released limited edition food products in collaboration with them. They also became voice actresses for the first animated miniseries based on the character Pickles the Frog, which first became associated with Hiragana Keyakizaka46 in 2017 after Kanemura gave a Pickles doll to each second generation member as Christmas presents.

In February 2021, the Saitama Trio were voted the most wanted unit (subgroup with their own songs) by fans on a Twitter campaign to commemorate Hinatazaka46's second debut anniversary. Hinatazaka46's sixth single, released in October 2021, would include their first song as a trio, performed under the unit name ; the name is a reference to a nickname for Saitama Prefecture, .

Discography

Studio albums

Singles

Promotional singles

Songs from Keyakizaka46's releases

Guest appearances

Other charted songs

Videography

Video albums

Tours and concerts

Concerts

Hiragana Keyakizaka46 
  (March 21–22, 2017: Zepp Tokyo)
  (January 30–February 1, 2018: Nippon Budokan)
  (December 11–13, 2018: Nippon Budokan)

Hinatazaka46 
  (March 5–6, 2019: Yokohama Arena)
  (September 26, 2019: Saitama Super Arena)
  (Christmas Live)
  (December 17–18, 2019: Makuhari Messe International Exhibition Hall Hall 4–6, second day also livestreamed)
  (December 24, 2020, only livestreamed)
  (December 24–25, 2021: Makuhari Messe International Exhibition Hall 9–11 Hall, both days also livestreamed)
  (December 17–18, 2022: Ariake Arena, second day also livestreamed)
  (Anniversary Live)
  (March 31, 2020: livestreaming only on YouTube)
  (March 27, 2021: livestreamed concert with limited audience seats, 746 seats were available)
  (March 30–31, 2022: Tokyo Dome, both days also livestreamed)
 Hinatazaka46 4th Anniversary Memorial Live 〜 4 Kaime no Hinatansai〜 (日向坂46 4周年記念MEMORIAL LIVE ～4回目のひな誕祭～) (April 1–2, 2023: Yokohama Stadium)
 （only livestreamed）
  (March 6, 2021: Hikari TV Channel)
 （December 22, 2022: Makuhari Messe International Exhibition Hall 9 Hall）
  (Joint event with Sakurazaka46: Fuji-Q Conifer Forest)
 2021 (July 10–11, 2021, both days also livestreamed)
 2022 (July 21・23, 2022: Live streaming only on the second day)
  (July 31, 2020, only livestreamed)
  (June 28, 2022: Tokyo International Forum, Hall A, also livestreamed)

Collaboration

Hinatazaka46×Dasada 
 Hinatazaka46×Dasada Live & Fashion Show (February 4–5, 2020, Yokohama Arena)
 Hinatazaka46×Dasada Fall & Winter Collection (October 15, 2020, only livestreamed)

Hinatazaka46×Koeharu! 
 Hinatazaka46×Koeharu Liveshow! (November 5, 2021, only livestreamed)

Tours

Hiragana Keyakizaka46

Hiragana Zenkoku Tour 2017 
The  took place from May 31 to December 12.

Hashiridasu Shunkan Tour 2018 
The  took place from June 4 to July 10.

Hinatazaka46

Zenkoku Ohisama ka Keikaku 2021 
The  took place from September 15 to October 20.

Happy Smile Tour 2022 

The Happy Smile Tour 2022 took place from September 1.

Filmography

Television

Dramas

Variety shows

Talk shows

Animation

Film

Documentary

Theatre

Radio

Games

Attraction

Fashion shows

Tokyo Girls Collection

GirlsAward

Events

Bibliography

Books

Photo book

Biography

Manga

Newspaper

Awards

Notes

References

External links 

  

 
Japanese idol groups
Japanese girl groups
Sakamichi Series
Musical groups established in 2015
2015 establishments in Japan